Fourth Street Historic District can refer to:

United States
listed alphabetically by U.S. state, then city
 Fourth Street Historic District (Sioux City, Iowa)
 West Fourth Street Historic District (Maysville, Kentucky)
 South Fourth Street Commercial Historic District in St. Joseph, Missouri
 Barelas-South Fourth Street Historic District in Albuquerque, New Mexico
 East Fourth Street Historic District (Cincinnati, Ohio)
 West Fourth Street Historic District (Cincinnati, Ohio)
 Fourth Street Historic District (Massillon, Ohio), in Stark County

See also
 4th Street (disambiguation)
 Fort Street Historic District, Boise, Idaho